There are two African currency unions associated with multinational central banks; the West African Banque Centrale des États de l'Afrique de l'Ouest (BCEAO) and the Central African Banque des États de l'Afrique Centrale (BEAC). Members of both currency unions use the CFA Franc as their legal tender.

Below is a list of the central banks and currencies of Africa.

See also

 Africa
 Economy of Africa
 List of African countries by GDP (nominal)
 List of African stock exchanges
 List of currencies in Africa

References
 World Economic Outlook Database, October 2012, International Monetary Fund. Accessed on October 10, 2013.

Africa-related lists
 
Currencies of Africa